Duxelles is a finely chopped (minced) mixture of mushrooms or mushroom stems, onions or shallots, herbs such as thyme or parsley, and black pepper, sautéed in butter and reduced to a paste. Cream is sometimes used as well, and some recipes add a dash of madeira or sherry. It is a basic preparation used in stuffings and sauces (notably, Beef Wellington) or as a garnish. Duxelles can also be filled into a pocket of raw pastry and baked as a savory tart.

Duxelles is made with any cultivated or wild mushroom, depending on the recipe. Duxelles made with wild porcini mushrooms will have a much stronger flavor than those made with white or brown mushrooms.

Duxelles is said to have been created by the 17th-century French chef François Pierre La Varenne (1615–1678) and to have been named after his employer, Nicolas Chalon du Blé, marquis d'Uxelles, maréchal de France.

Many classical cookbooks define duxelles as dehydrated fungi, used as stuffings and pastry fillings. According to Auguste Escoffier, the mushrooms were dehydrated in order to enhance flavor and minimize water content.  When fresh mushrooms are cooked, they let off enormous amounts of vapor in relation to their size.  Fresh mushrooms used as stuffings or pastry fillings could therefore build up pressure inside the dish or pastry, causing it to crack or even explode.

See also
 Sautéed mushrooms
 List of mushroom dishes

References

External links
 
 Mushroom Duxelles: Intense and Refined
 Mushroom Duxelle

Culinary terminology
Food ingredients
French cuisine
Mushroom dishes